UEF may refer to:

 Underwater Explorers' Federation, a Hungarian diver certification organization
 Unified Emulator Format
 Uniform energy factor for water heaters
 Union of European Federalists
 United Earth Federation, one of the fictional factions of the video game Supreme Commander
 University of Eastern Finland
 Ho Chi Minh City University of Economics and Finance